The Embassy of France to the Czech Republic is in Velkopřevorské náměstí, Malá Strana, Prague, near Kampa Island in the River Vltava. It occupies the baroque , which was originally built in 1667 and then altered during the 18th century. The ground floor of the embassy was flooded during the August 2002 floods.

See also
 Czech Republic–France relations
 Lycée français de Prague

References

External links 
 
 

France
Prague
Czech Republic–France relations
Palaces in Prague
Czechoslovakia–France relations